SSFCU may refer to:

Security Service Federal Credit Union, a credit union based in Texas
Suncoast Schools Federal Credit Union, a credit union based in Florida